Lisa Elliott is a female former gymnast who competed for England.

Gymnastics career
Elliott represented England and won a bronze medal in the team event, at the 1990 Commonwealth Games in Auckland, New Zealand.

References

British female artistic gymnasts
Commonwealth Games medallists in gymnastics
Commonwealth Games bronze medallists for England
Gymnasts at the 1990 Commonwealth Games
Year of birth missing (living people)
Living people
Medallists at the 1990 Commonwealth Games